John Nicholas William Rumple (March 4, 1841 – January 31, 1903) was a one-term Republican U.S. Representative from Iowa's 2nd congressional district.

Born near Fostoria, Ohio, Rumple attended the public schools of Fostoria, Western College in Shueyville, Iowa, and the normal (teaching) department of the University of Iowa.
In August 1861, following the outbreak of the American Civil War, he enlisted in Company H of the 2nd Regiment Iowa Volunteer Cavalry. He remained in the Army until October 1865, when mustered out as captain.

After studying law, he was admitted to the bar in 1867 and commenced practice in Marengo in Iowa County. In 1866 he married Addie M. Whiteling, who died in 1870. His second wife was Mary H. Shepard.

In 1873 he was elected to the Iowa Senate, where he served until 1878. He served as member of the Board of Regents of the University of Iowa from 1880 to 1886, and as curator of the State Historical Society of Iowa from 1881 to 1885.
In Marengo, he served as a city council member, as mayor (from 1885 to 1886), and as city attorney (from 1896 to 1900).  He also served as member of the local school board.

In 1900, Rumple was elected as a Republican to the U.S. House seat for Iowa's 2nd congressional district. He served in the Fifty-seventh Congress, but became seriously ill before the completion of his term. His illness prevented him from seeking re-election in 1902. Suffering from a cancerous tumor in his neck, he died on January 31, 1903, while hospitalized in Chicago, Illinois. He was interred in the Odd Fellows Cemetery in Marengo.

See also
List of United States Congress members who died in office (1900–49)

References

Sources

External links
 

1841 births
1903 deaths
University of Iowa alumni
Republican Party Iowa state senators
Iowa lawyers
People from Fostoria, Ohio
People from Johnson County, Iowa
Union Army officers
People from Marengo, Iowa
Iowa city council members
Mayors of places in Iowa
School board members in Iowa
Deaths from cancer in Illinois
People of Iowa in the American Civil War
Republican Party members of the United States House of Representatives from Iowa
19th-century American politicians
Deaths from throat cancer